Let 'Em Bleed Vol. 4 is the fourth and final mixtape of DJ Clay's mixtape series. The album was pushed back several times. It was originally set for release on April 15; however, it was pushed backed to the Gathering of the Juggalos on August 7. Due to the addition of an extra day due to the unusually high attendance, it was released a day early on the 6th.

Track listing

Intro - DJ Clay
U Ain't from Round Here - DJ Clay
Sleepstalker (Remix) - Boondox
It's Going Down - Axe Murder Boyz
Everywhere I Go - Blaze Ya Dead Homie
I'm Just Me (Remix) - ABK
Get Wild (Skit) - DJ Clay
Let Me Hear You - Boondox
See You All In Hell - Nyland the ODS (Contest Winner)
Outlaw - Axe Murder Boyz
I Shot a Hater - ICP, Twiztid, Three 6 Mafia
Bitch Get Off Me - DJ Clay
Hi-Rize (Remix) - Insane Clown Posse
Welcome to the Flames (South of Hell) - Boondox
All Work No Play - DJ Clay
Redemption Song - Razor Ray
Outro - DJ Clay

2009 mixtape albums
Hatchet House compilation albums
Sequel albums